"Come with Me" is a song written by Chuck Howard, and recorded by American country music artist Waylon Jennings.  It was released in August 1979 as the first single from the album, What Goes Around Comes Around.  The song was Jennings' eighth No. 1 on the Country chart as a solo artist.  The single stayed at No. 1 for two weeks and spent a total of thirteen weeks on the Country chart.

Charts

Weekly charts

Year-end charts

References

1979 singles
1979 songs
Waylon Jennings songs
RCA Records singles